Shane Michael Ray (born May 18, 1993) is an American football defensive lineman who is a free agent. He played college football at Missouri, where he was recognized as a unanimous All-American, and was drafted by the Denver Broncos in the first round of the 2015 NFL Draft.

High school career
Ray attended Bishop Miege High School in Roeland Park, Kansas, where he played football and competed in track. In football, he earned first-team all-state honors as a senior after totaling 100 tackles, including 16 tackles for loss, 10.5 sacks, three forced fumbles. In track & field, Ray competed in the throwing events. At the 2010 Baker Relays, he took gold in the shot put event with a throw of 14.60 meters (47 ft 9 in).

Considered a three-star recruit by Rivals.com, he was rated as the 17th best weakside defensive end prospect of his class. After being shown interest by programs such as Notre Dame, Kansas and Wisconsin, he ultimately decided to accept a scholarship to Missouri.

College career
After redshirting in his first season, he made 16 tackles, including 2.5 for loss, in 12 games as a backup defensive end for the Tigers. In 2013, played in all 14 games, recording 39 tackles, including nine for loss, and 4.5 sacks despite backing up Kony Ealy and Michael Sam. In 2014, he began to emerge as one of the premier pass rushers in the SEC. Through the first five games of the season, he set a new career high in tackles for loss (11) and sacks (8). In the 2014 SEC Championship Game, he was ejected from the game after targeting Alabama quarterback Blake Sims after throwing for what turned out to be a 58-yard touchdown to DeAndrew White. He cooled off towards the end of the season, but he still finished with 65 tackles, 22.5 TFL and 14.5 sacks, breaking the record of 11.5 that was owned by both Michael Sam and Aldon Smith. Following the season, he was named a consensus All-American and the SEC Defensive Player of the Year.

After his junior season, Ray entered the 2015 NFL Draft.

Professional career

Ray was prevented from participating in drills at the NFL Combine due to a foot injury similar to turf toe that he obtained during the 2015 Citrus Bowl, however many doctors have said surgery is not needed.

On April 27, 2015, days before the 2015 NFL Draft, Ray was cited for possession of marijuana.

Denver Broncos

Ray was a potential top ten draft pick until he was arrested for marijuana possession.  On April 30, 2015, Ray was selected by the Denver Broncos with the 23rd overall pick in the first round of the 2015 NFL Draft. Ray ended his rookie season with 20 tackles, four sacks, and one pass deflection.

Ray was on the Broncos when they won the Super Bowl on February 7, 2016, defeating the Carolina Panthers 24–10 in Super Bowl 50. Ray came off the bench and had two tackles and a forced fumble in the game.

On September 18, 2016, Ray scored his first career touchdown after a forced fumble was caused by Von Miller to seal a Broncos victory against the Indianapolis Colts by a score of 34–20. On September 25, 2016, Ray recorded a career-high three sacks in a 29–17 victory against the Cincinnati Bengals to help the Broncos improve to 3–0.

On July 28, 2017, it was revealed that Ray had suffered a torn ligament in his wrist, which ruled him out for six to eight weeks. He was placed on injured reserve on September 4, 2017, making him eligible to return in 2017. He was activated off injured reserve on October 30 for the team's Week 8 matchup against the Chiefs. He was placed back on injured reserve on December 19, 2017 after having his third wrist surgery.

On May 2, 2018, the Broncos declined Ray's fifth-year option. On June 6, 2018, it was reported that Ray would require another wrist surgery that would sideline him for at least three months.

Baltimore Ravens
On May 17, 2019, Ray signed with the Baltimore Ravens. He was released during final roster cuts on August 30, 2019.

Toronto Argonauts
On February 6, 2021, Ray signed with the Toronto Argonauts. He became a free agent upon the expiry of his contract on February 14, 2023.

Career statistics

Personal life
Shane's father, Wendell Ray, lettered at Missouri from 1978 to 1980 at the linebacker position and was a fifth-round draft pick in the 1981 NFL Draft by the Minnesota Vikings, but never played a regular-season game in the NFL. In an interview with Bleacher Report, Shane states that he and his mother were "trying to make it off food stamps."

References

External links
Missouri Tigers bio

1993 births
Living people
Players of American football from Kansas City, Missouri
Players of Canadian football from Kansas City, Missouri
American football defensive ends
American football linebackers
Bishop Miege High School alumni
Missouri Tigers football players
All-American college football players
Denver Broncos players
Baltimore Ravens players
American players of Canadian football
Canadian football linebackers
Toronto Argonauts players